Close Encounter is an album by the Swiss trumpeter/flugelhornist and composer Franco Ambrosetti which was recorded in 1978 and released on the Enja label the following year.

Reception

The Allmusic review by Scott Yanow stated "The sometimes episodic repertoire is quite obscure and generally hard bop-oriented. Everyone plays well on this lesser-known but enjoyable effort".

Track listing
All compositions by Franco Ambrosetti except where noted
 "Close Encounter" – 8:22
 "Napoleon Blown Apart" (Flavio Ambrosetti) – 5:39
 "Sad Story of a Photographer (Someday My Prints Will Come)" — 8:12
 "Morning Song of a Spring Flower" (George Gruntz) – 14:29
 "Rumba Organistica" (Joachim Kühn) – 6:02

Personnel
Franco Ambrosetti – flugelhorn, trumpet
Bennie Wallace – tenor saxophone
George Gruntz – piano
Mike Richmond – bass
Bob Moses – drums

References

Franco Ambrosetti albums
1979 albums
Enja Records albums